Kevin Foster is an American retired ice hockey left wing who was an All-American for Vermont.

Career
Foster came to the University of Vermont in 1981, at the tail end of Jim Cross's tenure with the program. Despite the team being middling at best, Foster put up respectable numbers as a freshman and was selected for the US national team at the 1983 World Junior Ice Hockey Championships. He was teamed up with Mike O'Connor and future Hobey Baker Award-winner, Scott Fusco and helped the team finish a respectable if disappointing 5th.

Foster's junior season is what made his career as a Catamount. He doubled his career point total in one season and was named an All-American but couldn't prevent Vermont from finishing last in their division. Cross retired after the season and was replaced by Mike Gilligan. Foster was named team captain for his senior season but the results were much the same. Vermont finished near the bottom of the conference standings and Foster's scoring production declined back to where it had been in his first two seasons.

After graduating, Foster played one season of professional hockey before retiring. He was inducted into the Vermont Athletic Hall of Fame in 1998.

Statistics

Regular season and playoffs

International

Awards and honors

References

External links

1962 births
Living people
Ice hockey players from New Jersey
People from Glen Ridge, New Jersey
American men's ice hockey left wingers
AHCA Division I men's ice hockey All-Americans
Vermont Catamounts men's ice hockey players
Maine Mariners players
Fort Wayne Komets players